LAPLander (short for light airbag-protected lander) is a prototype of a space probe primarily intended for measurements in the ionosphere. The aim for the prototype is to evaluate the flight characteristics, e.g. air braking, of a flight from the border of space. Furthermore, the impact protection and recovery systems will be evaluated. As the name says, the recovery system is based on airbags, that serve both to the deceleration and the impact protection. The future version of LAPLander will make it possible to do multi-point measurements, which will be of great help in research of the complex processes within the ionosphere that contributes to auroras and disturbances in satellite communication.

Rexus flight 
LAPLander is selected in the Rexus programme  and was  launched on a sounding rocket flight from Esrange Space Center (outside Kiruna) in March 2010. The rocket is unguided, spin-stabilized and powered by an Improved Orion motor, which is capable to bring the payload to an apogee of 100 km, which is the border to space. The event is sponsored by the Swedish National Space Agency (SNSA) and the German Space Agency (DLR), in cooperation with the European Space Agency (ESA).

Flight characteristics 
In order to reconstruct the flight, LAPLander will record the following parameters:
Three-axis acceleration
Three-axis rotation rate
Three-component magnetic field
Temperature (for various parts of the payload)
Raw GPS data

The latter is provided by a cooperation with Cornell University, New York, United States. The device to be used is a novel miniature GPS system, that in contrast to a common GPS is able to determine the attitude. This is made by measuring the phase difference from the GPS signal between two antennas.

Development 
The development of LAPlander started in 2008 and took place at the Alfvén Laboratory, Royal Institute of Technology in Stockholm.

The LAPLander team 
The team behind this project consists of:

Overall issues:
Dr. Nickolay Ivchenko, supervisor, Sweden
Torbjörn Sundberg, team leader, PhD student, Sweden
Mechanical and aerodynamical issues:
Matias Wartelski, MSc aerospace engineering student, Spain
Christian Westlund, MSc aerospace engineering student, Sweden
Li Xin, MSc aerospace engineering student, China
 Erik Sund, MSc aerospace engineering student, Sweden
 Patrtik Ahlen, MSc aerospace engineering student, Sweden
Electrical issues:
Malin Gustafsson, MSc electrical engineering student, Sweden
Joakim Sandström, MSc electrical engineering student, Sweden
Oliver Neuner, MSc electrophysics student, Germany
Christian Jonsson, MSc mechatronics engineering student, Sweden
Johan Juhlén, MSc mechatronics engineering student, Sweden
Johan Thelander, MSc mechatronics engineering student, Sweden
Mattias Hedberg, MSc mechatronics engineering student, Sweden

See also 
Space probe

References

External links 
Official site
Blog written by the LAPLander team (started 2009-03-13)

Space programme of Sweden